Sunjoy Monga is a wildlife photographer, conservationist, naturalist and writer based in Mumbai in India. He was born in Masjid Bunder.

He has initiated an environmental awareness drive 'Young Rangers' amongst schools and school children across India. He has also been chosen on the Tumbhi advisory panel.

References

Indian ornithologists
Indian wildlife photographers
Artists from Mumbai
Living people
Year of birth missing (living people)
Members of the Bombay Natural History Society